Leroy Mitchell (born September 22, 1944) is a former American football cornerback. He played college football at Texas Southern University.  In 1967, he joined the Boston Patriots of the American Football League (AFL). He played there for two seasons and was an AFL All-Star selection in 1968. He would go on to play in the NFL for the Houston Oilers (1970), and the Denver Broncos (1971–1973).

See also
 List of American Football League players

References

1944 births
Living people
American football cornerbacks
Boston Patriots players
Denver Broncos players
Houston Oilers players
Texas Southern Tigers football players
American Football League All-Star players
People from Wharton, Texas
Players of American football from Texas
American Football League players